Acleris hispidana is a species of moth of the family Tortricidae. It is found in South Korea, China, Japan and Russia (Vladivostok, Amur).

The wingspan is 21–26 mm. Adults are on wing in May and from September to October.

The larvae feed on Quercus mongolica.

References

Moths described in 1881
hispidana
Moths of Asia